Joan Morrissey is a former American rugby union player. She was a member of the  squad that won the inaugural 1991 Women's Rugby World Cup in Wales.

Morrissey was part of the Wiverns team that toured England and France in 1985. She made seven appearances for the Wiverns and scored a try in their tour. In 2017 Morrissey and the 1991 World Cup squad were inducted into the United States Rugby Hall of Fame.

References 

Year of birth missing (living people)
Living people
Female rugby union players
American female rugby union players
United States women's international rugby union players